National Institute of Civil Aviation may refer to

Instituto Nacional de Aviação Civil, the national civil aviation authority of Angola
National Institute of Civil Aviation, the national civil aviation authority of Venezuela